Tablers was an American soccer team which spent four season in the St. Louis Soccer League, from 1927 to 1931. During that time it won three league titles.

History
In 1927, John Marre purchased Ratican’s, a team which had spent three seasons at the bottom of the league standings, from Harry Ratican, renaming the team Tablers.  The change in ownership revitalized the team and Marre coached it to three consecutive league titles.  It dropped out of the league after the 1930-1931 season.

Record

References

External links
 St. Louis Soccer League standings

Defunct soccer clubs in Missouri
Association football clubs established in 1927
Soccer clubs in St. Louis
St. Louis Soccer League teams
1927 establishments in Missouri
1931 disestablishments in Missouri
Association football clubs disestablished in 1931